The Squire of Alsatia is a 1688 comedy play by the English writer Thomas Shadwell. Alsatia was a nickname for the Whitefriars area of London, deriving from Alsace in northeastern France. A restoration comedy, it was performed at the Drury Lane Theatre by the United Company following on from John Crowne's Darius, King of Persia. One of the best-remembered roles, that of the shrewish  Mrs. Termagant was first performed by Elizabeth Boutell. It was revived numerous times during the eighteenth century.

The original Drury Lane cast included Anthony Leigh as Sir William Belfond, Philip Griffin as Sir Edward Belfond, Thomas Jevon as Belford senior, William Mountfort as Belfont junior, John Bowman as Trueman, Samuel Sandford as Cheatly, George Powell as Shamwell, George Bright as Captain Hackum, Martin Powell as Attorney, John Freeman as Scrapeall, Cave Underhill as Lolpoop, John Verbruggen as Termagant, Frances Maria Knight as Teresia, Susanna Verbruggen as Isabella, Anne Bracegirdle as Lucia and Elizabeth Boutell as Mrs. Termagant.

References

Bibliography
 Duckworth, George E. Nature of Roman Comedy: A Study in Popular Entertainment. Princeton University Press, 2015
 Van Lennep, W. The London Stage, 1660-1800: Volume One, 1660-1700. Southern Illinois University Press, 1960.

1688 plays
West End plays
Plays by Thomas Shadwell
Restoration comedy
Plays set in London